Emmanuel "Lolo" González Rodríguez (born 22 July 1991) is a Spanish professional footballer who plays for San Fernando CD as a defensive midfielder.

Club career
Born in Sanlúcar de Barrameda, Cádiz, Lolo joined Atlético Sanluqueño CF's youth setup at the age of 14, from CD Sanlúcar. On 14 September 2008, aged just 17, he made his senior debut with the reserves by starting in a 1–0 Regional Preferente Cádiz home win against Atlético Zabal; seven days later he scored his first senior goal, in a 6–0 away routing of Federico Mayo CF.

Lolo made his first team debut on 13 March 2010, playing the full 90 minutes in a 0–1 loss at Recreativo de Huelva B in the Tercera División. Definitely promoted to the main squad ahead of the 2010–11 season, he immediately became a first choice, and contributed with 38 appearances (play-offs included) as his side achieved promotion to the Segunda División B in 2012.

On 6 July 2012, Lolo signed for Real Betis, being immediately loaned back to Sanluqueño for one year. Upon returning, he was assigned to the B-team in the fourth division, and helped in their promotion to the third division in 2013–14.

On 13 August 2015, free agent Lolo joined CD San Roque de Lepe of the third tier, suffering team relegation at the end of the campaign. The following 28 June, he moved to fellow league team Marbella FC, being again a regular starter.

On 28 June 2017, Lolo agreed to a contract with CD El Ejido, still in the third division. A year later, after scoring a career-best ten goals, he signed for Real Oviedo, being initially assigned to the B-team also in level three.

On 18 January 2019, Lolo was loaned to Segunda División side Extremadura UD, for six months. He made his professional debut on 16 March, coming on as a late substitute for Alberto Perea in a 0–1 away loss against Albacete Balompié.

Lolo scored his first professional goal on 6 April 2019, netting the game's only through a penalty kick in a home defeat of UD Almería.

Career statistics

References

External links

Beticopedia profile 

1991 births
Living people
People from Sanlúcar de Barrameda
Sportspeople from the Province of Cádiz
Footballers from Andalusia
Spanish footballers
Association football midfielders
Segunda División players
Segunda División B players
Tercera División players
Divisiones Regionales de Fútbol players
Atlético Sanluqueño CF players
Betis Deportivo Balompié footballers
CD San Roque de Lepe footballers
Marbella FC players
CD El Ejido players
Real Oviedo Vetusta players
Extremadura UD footballers
Real Oviedo players
San Fernando CD players